You'll Be Mine may refer to:

"You'll Be Mine" (The Beatles song)
"You'll Be Mine (Party Time)", a song by Gloria Estefan
"You'll Be Mine", a song by Howlin' Wolf from Howlin' Wolf
"You'll Be Mine" (The Pierces song)
"You'll Be Mine" (Havana Brown song), a song by DJ Havana Brown from her debut EP When the Lights Go Out
"You'll Be Mine", a 2018 song by Michael Learns to Rock from Still